Institut Pendidikan Guru Kampus Tun Abdul Razak (English: Institute of Teacher Education Tun Abdul Razak Campus) or IPG Kampus Tun Abdul Razak (formerly known as Maktab Perguruan Samarahan) is a school in Malaysia under the Ministry of Education. The campus is situated at Jalan Dato Mohd. Musa in Kota Samarahan, Sarawak, East Malaysia.

External links
Official website

Education schools in Malaysia
Universities and colleges in Sarawak
Educational institutions established in 1999
1999 establishments in Malaysia